The First Stage of the 2009 Copa Santander Libertadores ran from January 27 to February 5.

Format
Twelve teams qualified into this rounds and each will play a two-legged tie, one at home and one away. The winner of each tie will advance to the Second Stage. The teams will earn 3 points for a win, 1 point for a draw, and 0 for a loss. The team with the most points advances. The following criteria will be used for breaking ties on points:

Goal difference
Goals scored
Away goals

Results
Team #1 played the first leg at home.

Matches

First leg

Second Leg

Independiente Medellín advances on points 4–1.

Deportivo Cuenca advances on goal difference.

Estudiantes advances on away goals.

Palmeiras advances on points 6–0.

Universidad de Chile advances on away goals.

Nacional advances on points 4–1.

External links
CONMEBOL's official website 

First Stage